The river Anavros and Anaurus is a torrent near the ancient city of Iolkos (modern-day Volos), flowing from Mount Pelion into the Pagasetic Gulf.
The hero Jason was said to have lost a sandal in its waters, as he ferried the disguised goddess Hera across its stream.

References

Rivers of Greece
Landforms of Magnesia (regional unit)
Rivers of Thessaly
Drainage basins of the Aegean Sea
Iolcus
Jason